Daniel Schmutzhard (born 1982) is an Austrian operatic baritone.

Life 
He continued his studies at the University of Music and Performing Arts Vienna with Ralf Döring.

From 2005 to 2011 he was a member of the ensemble at the Volksoper Wien and from 2011 to 2018 at the Oper Frankfurt. At the same time he was a guest at the Bregenzer Festspiele, the Theater an der Wien, the Berlin State Opera, the Paris Opera and the Komische Oper Berlin.

Since the 2018/19 season, he has been working freelance.

He has been married to the opera singer Annette Dasch since 2011 and has two children.

Recording 
 Bach: Christmas Oratorio, with Paul Schweinester as the Evangelist, Choir and soloists of the Wilten Boys' Choir, Academia Jacobus Stainer. Conductor: Johannes Stecher. (Gramola, CD and DVD)

References

External links 
 Daniel Schmutzhard Homepage
 
 Daniel Schmutzhard on Opera Musica
 Daniel Schmutzhard on Arsis

1982 births
Living people
People from Innsbruck-Land District
University of Music and Performing Arts Vienna alumni
Austrian operatic baritones
21st-century Austrian  male opera singers